Minuscule 902 (in the Gregory-Aland numbering), ε 1213 (von Soden), is a 12th-century Greek minuscule manuscript of the New Testament on parchment. It has marginalia. The manuscript has survived in complete condition.

Description 

The codex contains the text of the four Gospels, on 230 parchment leaves (size ), with some lacunae. The text is written in one column per page, 24 lines per page.
It contains also Credo in Greek on folio 4 recto.

Text 
The Greek text of the codex is a representative of the Byzantine. Hermann von Soden classified it to the textual family Antiocheian (i.e. Byzantine) commentated text with siglum Ak. Kurt Aland placed it in Category V.

According to the Claremont Profile Method it represents the textual family Kx in Luke 1 and Luke 20. In Luke 10 no profile was made. It creates textual pair with minuscule 53.

History 

According to F. H. A. Scrivener and C. R. Gregory it was written in the 12th century. Currently the manuscript is dated by the INTF to the 12th century. It once belonged to Jakob Jonas Björnståhl (1731-1779), professor from Lund University, who bequeathed it for the University of Uppsala. In 1784 it was acquired for the library of the University of Uppsala as "Björnståhl 3" along with 901 and 1852. Gregory saw it in 1891.

The manuscript was added to the list of New Testament manuscripts by Scrivener (616e) and Gregory (902e).

It is not cited in critical editions of the Greek New Testament (UBS4, NA28).

The manuscript is housed at the Uppsala University (Gr. 13) in Uppsala.

See also 

 List of New Testament minuscules (1–1000)
 Biblical manuscript
 Textual criticism

References

Further reading

External links 
 

Greek New Testament minuscules
12th-century biblical manuscripts